Dasaradhi Rangacharya (24 August 1928 – 8 June 2015), also spelled Dasarathi Rangacharya, was an Indian poet and writer in Telugu language. He participated actively in the Telangana armed struggle against the rule of the Nizams. His writings incorporated the lifestyle of the people of Telangana under the rule of the Nizams. He was conferred with Kala Ratna award in 2006.

Personal life 
Dasaradhi Rangacharya was born on 24 August 1928 in Hyderabad State (in present-day Telangana). Upon being expelled from school, he moved to Vijayawada for further education. He was married to Kamalamma and had a son and two daughters. His brother, Dasarathi Krishnamacharya, was also a writer.

Career 
Dasaradhi started working as a teacher during 1951 and 1957. Later he moved to Hyderabad and worked between 1957 and 1988 in the municipal corporation in Secunderabad Division.

Writings 
Dasaradhi incorporated the lifestyle of the people of Telangana under the rule of Nizam of Hyderabad in his novels. He wrote them in Telangana dialect against the counsel of his peers. These are considered "rarest of the great novels produced in Telangana" on the account of feudalism and lower literacy rate present in then Telangana region. Chillara Devullu was published in 1969 and was adapted into a 1977 Telugu movie by the same name–.

"Maya Jalataru", "Sara Talpam" and "Ranunnadi Edi Nizam". He translated the 4 Vedas into Telugu language. He wrote his autobiography under the title .

Awards 
Dasaradhi was conferred with Kala Ratna in 2006 by the government of united Andhra Pradesh.

Death 
Dasaradhi died on 8 June 2015 in Yashoda Hospitals in Somajiguda, Hyderabad and was given a state funeral by the Government of Telangana.

References

Further reading

External links 
 Dasaradhi Rangacharya's writings (in Telugu) at Archive.org

Indian male poets
Telugu poets
1928 births
2015 deaths
20th-century Indian poets
Poets from Telangana
20th-century Indian male writers
21st-century Indian male writers
21st-century Indian poets
Writers from Hyderabad, India
Recipients of the Kala Ratna